Milky Way Farm in Giles County, Tennessee, is the former estate of Franklin C. Mars, founder of Mars Candies. The property is named for the company's Milky Way candy bar. During the Great Depression, the estate was the largest employer in Giles county. The estate is listed on the National Register of Historic Places as an historic district; the farm and manor house are now used for weddings, tours, trail runs, & special events.

History 
Franklin Mars and his second wife, Ethel V. Mars, purchased the  property in 1930, shortly after establishing a southern office of Mars Candies in Nashville. Architect James F. Drake was hired to design the Tudor Revival manor house and farm facilities for breeding Thoroughbred horses and Hereford cattle. Construction peaked between 1931 and 1933. With 800 workers during construction, Milky Way Farm became the largest employer in Giles County. During construction, many of the workers lived on the farm with their families. Mars is reputed to have been generous to his workers, who received free candy bars, as well as small loans and other forms of assistance.

Mars died in 1934, too soon to see the success of the farming operations. He was buried in a mausoleum on Milky Way Farm. His widow, Ethel Mars, oversaw the planned livestock operations. Milky Way Farm produced prize-winning Hereford cattle and thoroughbred horses that were winners on the racetrack, beginning with the farm's first racing season in 1934. Winnings in 1936 totaled $206,450, making the Milky Way Farm stable the season's most successful owner on the U.S. thoroughbred racing circuit. In 1940, Milky Way Farm's Gallahadion won the Kentucky Derby.

In March 1945, when Ethel Mars was in declining health (she died in December 1945), the farm was sold. In the subsequent decades it fell into disrepair until new owners stepped in to save the historic property.

Description
The  Tudor Revival manor house has 35 rooms, including 21 bedrooms, and 12 original bathrooms. The house was designed for entertaining, and many of the individual rooms are unusually large. The living room features exposed beams and a  ceiling. The Mars' dining room table is reputed to have been the largest private dining table in Tennessee. The house was surrounded by landscaped grounds, including magnolia trees, and had an outdoor swimming pool and tennis courts.

Outbuildings included 70 cottages, 30 barns, and a horse-racing track. Local limestone was used in most of the farm buildings, which have been described as having Spanish-inspired architecture. Outbuildings that were still intact as of 2007 included the groundskeeper's cottage; several of the barns, including an octagonal barn; stables; and well-houses. Although Franklin Mars' remains were reinterred in a Minnesota cemetery, his mausoleum at Milky Way Farm still stands.

Milky Way Farm was listed on the National Register of Historic Places on September 27, 1984. It was described as significant for its role in sustaining the local economy during the Depression, its association with Franklin Mars, and its architecture.

Milky Way Farm Today
In 2007 the property was sold for a reported price of $10 million. The buyer announced plans for a $400 million development of a luxury residential community to consist of 750 to 900 homes, an equestrian club including a horse track and polo field, a golf course, and equestrian trails. Ferrier became ill and the property went into foreclosure in May 2009. Beginning in 2010, Milky Way Farm was purchased in sections by a father and daughter until over 1100 acres of the original property were reconstituted.  With the assistance of the Tennessee Land Trust, the front acreage was placed in permanent agricultural easement, and slowly improvements began to once again protect the property. The historic Manor House, barns, roofs, roads, and stone walls have each received attention. In 2017, the reigns were passed to the daughter and her sister to continue to care for this Tennessee landmark.  Revenue from events, tours, weddings, corporate meetings, trail runs, farming, guided hunts, and seasonal festivals help operate and restore the property. It has been home to events such as the Warrior Dash, Tough Mudder, Green Beret Challenge, and the Spartan Race.  Current renovation projects include improvements to the Show Barn, Manor House, roads, and the historic race track.

References

External links
Milky Way Farm website

American racehorse owners and breeders
Owners of Kentucky Derby winners
Buildings and structures in Giles County, Tennessee
Historic districts on the National Register of Historic Places in Tennessee
Mars family
Farms on the National Register of Historic Places in Tennessee
Octagon barns in the United States
Tudor Revival architecture in Tennessee
Houses completed in 1931
Barns in Tennessee
National Register of Historic Places in Giles County, Tennessee